Shabestar (electoral district) is the 8th electoral district in the East Azerbaijan Province of Iran. This electoral district has a population of 124,499 and elects 1 member of parliament.

1980
MP in 1980 from the electorate of Shabestar. (1st)
 Mohammad Mojtahed Shabestari

1984
MP in 1984 from the electorate of Shabestar. (2nd)
 Mohammad Bagher Akhondi

1988
MP in 1988 from the electorate of Shabestar. (3rd)
 Hassan Aminlu

1992
MP in 1992 from the electorate of Shabestar. (4th)
 Hassan Aminlu

1996
MP in 1996 from the electorate of Shabestar. (5th)
 Ali Mousavi Kozekanani

2000
MP in 2000 from the electorate of Shabestar. (6th)
 Karim Ghiasi-Moradi

2004
MP in 2004 from the electorate of Shabestar. (7th)
 Karim Ghiasi-Moradi

2008
MP in 2008 from the electorate of Shabestar. (8th)
 Ali Motahari

2012
MP in 2012 from the electorate of Shabestar. (9th)
 Ali Alilu

2016

Notes

References

Electoral districts of East Azerbaijan
Shabestar County
Deputies of Shabestar